is a Japanese baseball infielder. He previously played for the Yokohama DeNA BayStars in Japan's Pacific League.

External links

 NPB.com

1986 births
Living people
Ishikawa Million Stars players
Japanese baseball players
Nippon Professional Baseball infielders
People from Tokyo
Tohoku Rakuten Golden Eagles players
Yokohama DeNA BayStars players